Bac an Eich (849 m) is a mountain in Ross and Cromarty in the Northwest Highlands of Scotland.

A very remote mountain, it lies at the head of Strathconan, from where it makes for a fairly straightforward climb with stalkers paths leading up to the summit. The nearest settlement is Inverchoran.

References

Mountains and hills of the Northwest Highlands
Marilyns of Scotland
Corbetts